Michael Joseph Miller (born May 18, 1968) is an American Republican politician from Florida. He served two terms in the Florida House of Representatives, representing the 47th District, which includes Belle Isle, Edgewood, Orlando, and Winter Park in central Orange County, from 2014 to 2018.

He was the Republican nominee for Florida's 7th congressional district in the 2018 election, and lost to incumbent Democrat Stephanie Murphy.

Early life and career
Miller was born in Washington, D.C., and later moved to Florida, attending the University of Florida on a baseball scholarship. After graduating from college, he worked for United States Senator Connie Mack III as a staff assistant. In 2000, when Ric Keller was elected to the United States House of Representatives, Miller was selected as his district director, a position that he held for three years. He worked on Bill McCollum's 2004 United States Senate campaign, which was ultimately unsuccessful, as his finance director. After leaving the McCollum campaign, Miller worked as a consultant in business development, serving as the Business Development Officer at CNLBank and becoming the Director of Development and the Director of Marketing and Corporate Sponsorship of Athletics at Rollins College. While working as a consultant, he attended Rollins, receiving his Master of Business Administration in 2008. After completing his final term in the Florida House, Mike became the Chief of External Affairs for the Florida Virtual School (www.flvs.net).  Currently, Mike is the Vice President of External Affairs at Space Florida (spaceflorida.gov) assisting aerospace companies operate in Florida. <https://www.spaceflorida.gov/about/executive-staff/>

Florida House of Representatives
In 2014, Miller announced his intention to challenge the incumbent HD47 State Representative Linda Stewart, a heavily favored Democrat. Facing environmental consultant Mo Pearson in the Republican primary, Miller prevailed with 74% of the vote and went on to beat Democrat Linda Stewart. During his first term in the Florida House of Representatives Miller worked across the aisle to pass bills to combat veteran homelessness and cosponsored legislation to address the human trafficking crisis. In 2015, Miller was assigned to the House Ways and Means committee.

In 2016 Miller was not challenged by a primary opponent and faced Democrat Beth Turra in the general election. In a district that Hillary Clinton won by 12 percent, Miller was able to retain his seat.

Electoral history

References

External links
Florida House of Representatives - Mike Miller
Mike Miller for State Representative

1968 births
21st-century American politicians
Gonzaga College High School alumni
Living people
Republican Party members of the Florida House of Representatives
United States congressional aides
People from Washington, D.C.
People from Winter Park, Florida
Rollins College alumni
University of Florida alumni
Candidates in the 2018 United States elections